The Silent Holy Stones is a 2006 Tibetan feature film written and directed by Pema Tseden. The Silent Holy Stones is about the tale of a young Lama who comes from a remote monastery is enthusiastic about life, eager to learn, and curious about everything. The film won the Best Directorial Debut at the 25th Golden Rooster Awards, Asian New Talent Award for Best Director at the 8th Changchun Film Festival, and Best First Feature at the 13th Beijing College Student Film Festival. The film was released on June 1, 2006, in China.

Cast
 Luosang Danpai as the young Lama, a ten-year-old Tibetan boy.
 Living Buddha Juhuancang as himself.

Production
This film was shot in Guwa Monastery, northwest China's Qinghai province.

Accolades

References

External links
 
 
 

2006 films
Chinese drama films
Tibetan-language films
Films shot in Qinghai
Films set in Qinghai
Films about Tibet
Films directed by Pema Tseden